Noakhali Sadar is an upazila of Noakhali District in the Division of Chittagong, Bangladesh. Noakhali Thana was established in 1861 and was converted into an upazila in 1984. The upazila takes its name from the district and the Bengali word sadar (headquarters). It is the subdistrict where the district headquarters, Noakhali town, is located. The town is situated on the western bank of the Noakhali Canal, from which it takes its name. The Noakhali Canal was dug in 1660 to control flooding of the river Dakatia. The name Noakhali means "New canal", derived from the Bengali words noa (new) and khal (canal).

Geography
It borders Begumganj Upazila to the north, Kabirhat Upazila to the east, Suborno Char Upazila to the south, and Komolnagar and Lakshmipur Sadar upazilas of Lakshmipur District to the west. The Noakhali Canal flows north through the upazila.

Demographics

According to the 2011 Bangladesh census, Noakhali Sadar Upazila had 100,219 households and a population of 525,934, 24.9% of whom lived in urban areas. 12.3% of the population was under the age of 5. The literacy rate (age 7 and over) was 51.7%, compared to the national average of 51.8%.

The boundaries of the upazila were redrawn in 2005 to create a new upazila, Suborno Char, and again in 2006 to create Kabirhat Upazila. The combined population of the three in 2011 was 1,012,392, a 32% increase from 2001.

Sports
The most popular sports in the upazila are football and cricket. Shaheed Bulu Stadium is used for both, as well as for large community gatherings such as Victory Day celebrations.

Administration
Noakhali Sadar Upazila is divided into Noakhali Municipality and 13 union parishads: Anderchar, Ashwadia, Binodpur, Char Matua, Dadpur, Dharmapur, Ewazbalia, Kadir Hanif, Kaladaraf, Niazpur, Noakhali, Noannai, and Purba Char Matua. The union parishads are subdivided into 166 mauzas and 173 villages.

Noakhali Municipality was established in 1876. It is subdivided into 9 wards and 36 mahallas.

Transport
Rail stations Maijdi, Maijdi Court, Harinarayanpur, and Noakhali are the last four on the branch line connecting Laksam and Noakhali. In May 2015, they were served by one intercity and four mail trains a day.

Education

Noakhali Science and Technology University, founded in 2006, is the only university. Noakhali Medical College, founded in 2008, is the only medical school.

There are ten colleges in the upazila: Bandher Hat A. M. College, Bhulua Degree College, Char Matua College, Maijdee Public College, Major (Rtd) Abdul Mannan College, National Model College, Noakhali Government College (founded in 1963), Noakhali Government Women's College, Noakhali Model College, and Sonapur Degree College.

According to Banglapedia, Noakhali Zilla School, founded in 1853, Brother Andre High School (1857), Ahmadia Model High School (1906), Arun Chandra High School (1914), Noakhali Government Girls' High School (1934), and Paura Kalyan High School (1940) are notable secondary schools.

The madrasa education system includes two fazil and two kamil madrasas.

Notable residents
Muzaffar Ahmed, one of the founders of the Communist Party of India, was educated at Noakhali Zilla School.
Zahurul Haq, whose arrest in the Agartala Conspiracy Case and 1969 death in custody led to mass protests, graduated from Noakhali Zilla School.
Saadat Husain, former cabinet secretary and former chairman of Bangladesh Public Service Commission, grew up in Noakhali town.
A B M Musa, awarded the Ekushey Padak for journalism in 1999, attended Noakhali Zilla School.
Abdul Malek Ukil, a drafter of the Constitution of Bangladesh, member of parliament and cabinet minister, was born in Rajapur village.

See also
Upazilas of Bangladesh
Districts of Bangladesh
Divisions of Bangladesh

References

Upazilas of Noakhali District